Kue putu mayang is an Indonesian Betawi string hopper dish made of starch or rice flour and coconut milk, then shaped like noodles. This noodle-like dish served with kinca (liquid palm sugar) in Betawi and Javanese cuisine, or with chutney or curry in Indian Indonesian cuisine.

See also

Cuisine of Indonesia
Idiyappam
Kue putu
Kue putu mangkok
Kue klepon

References

Indonesian rice dishes
Indonesian desserts
Kue
Street food in Indonesia